Barbara Mitchell was an actress.

Barbara Mitchell may also refer to:

 Barbara Mitchell (swimmer), American swimmer in 1972 Olympics
 Barbara Mitchell, musician in High Inergy
 Barbara Mitchell, character in 52 Pick-Up